A Natural Monument in Brazil is a type of protected area of Brazil defined by law. 
The purpose of a natural monument to conserve unique or very beautiful natural sites.

Definition

The Natural Monument class of conservation unit was defined by the law 19/93 of 23 January 1993.
This basic objective of this type of unit is to preserve natural sites that are unique and/or have great scenic beauty.
They may be private property as long as the owner's use is compatible with the objectives.
If not, the area is expropriated.
The public may visit the natural monuments, and research may be conducted with permission of the responsible agency.

Selected list

Notes

Sources

 

Lists of protected areas of Brazil
Types of protected area of Brazil